Erinia, also Rineia ( or Ρήνεια), is a Greek island in the Sporades located west of Skyros.

Nearest islands and islets
Its nearest islands and islets are Skyropoula to the west, Skyros to the north and Valaxa to the east.

Landforms of Central Greece
Landforms of Euboea (regional unit)